Lin Wenjun (born 3 June 1997) is a Chinese sprint canoeist.

She won a medal at the 2019 ICF Canoe Sprint World Championships.

References

1997 births
Living people
Chinese female canoeists
ICF Canoe Sprint World Championships medalists in Canadian
Canoeists at the 2020 Summer Olympics
Olympic canoeists of China
20th-century Chinese women
21st-century Chinese women